A kindeel is a lantern with a wooden framework and covered in coloured matte or glossy papers. These lanterns are generally hung in front of homes during the Hindu festival of lights, Diwali. Kandeel in Sanskrit is known asakasha deepa (lantern of the sky), 'akash diwa' (sky light), and in Kannada, Goodu Deepa (nested light), or Nakshatra Gudu (star-like nest).
Hindus in earlier days set kindeels afloat high, a gesture to invite the spirits of their ancestors moving around to come back home and be with them during the festival time; hence the name akasha deepa (lantern of the sky) or Akasha Kindil.

In the state of Kerala, especially in Fort Kochi, a city in Ernakulam District, it is known as akasha vilakku. Hindu Vaishyas (Konkani-speaking linguistic minority of Kerala), who had escaped from Goa during the Goa inquisition carried out by the Portuguese invaders, dwelt in Kerala. During the Hindu lunar month of 'Kartika', people used to put akasha deepam, colloquially known in the Konkani dialect as panjire, on rooftops, and light them at night until break of dawn in the nights leading up to the Karthika Paurnami (full moon) day or Dev Dewali day. Earlier, oil lamps were used, which were attached to the panjire; now coloured electric lights are used instead. By lighting the panjire it is believed that during Kartika, the spirits of the dead visit their relatives' houses to wish them well; or that if they are not lit, the dead will curse their relatives to live in darkness through life.

Kindeels are hung for around a month from the first day of Diwali. Kandeels are traditionally built in a crystal shape with tails at the bottom; shapes include stars, globes, delicate dotted designs, and simple drawings. Opaque papers cut into a complex design give more beauty to a Kandeel by blocking some of the light behind it.

References

Types of lamp